Michael Feinstein with the Israel Philharmonic Orchestra is a 2001 album by American vocalist Michael Feinstein accompanied by the Israel Philharmonic Orchestra, with arrangements by Alan Broadbent. It was Feinstein's third album for the Concord label, and his first orchestral recording.

Reception

The Allmusic review by Stephen Thomas Erlewine awarded the album 4 stars and said the album "comes across as a slyly romantic, lightly swinging big band session",  he also praised Feinstein's "classy, understated delivery and the skillful arrangements of Broadbent".

Track listing
 "The Folks Who Live On the Hill" (Oscar Hammerstein II, Jerome Kern) - 6:09
 "The Best Is Yet to Come" (Cy Coleman, Carolyn Leigh) - 3:01
 "Guess I'll Hang My Tears Out to Dry" (Sammy Cahn, Jule Styne) - 4:47
 "By Myself" (Howard Dietz, Arthur Schwartz) - 4:11
 "Spring Will Be a Little Late This Year" (Frank Loesser) - 5:41
 "Stormy Weather" (Harold Arlen, Ted Koehler) - 5:25
 "Laura" (Johnny Mercer, David Raksin) - 5:40
 "On a Clear Day (You Can See Forever)" (Burton Lane, Alan Jay Lerner) - 2:38
 "Love Is Here to Stay" (George Gershwin, Ira Gershwin) - 5:56
 "How Deep Is the Ocean?" (Irving Berlin) - 4:45
 "Somewhere" (Leonard Bernstein, Stephen Sondheim) - 5:36
 "I Won't Send Roses" (Jerry Herman) - 3:25

Recorded between May 6–10, 2002.

Personnel
Michael Feinstein - vocals, piano
The Israel Philharmonic Orchestra
Alan Broadbent - arranger, conductor, piano
Avishai Cohen - double bass
Albie Berk - drums

References

Concord Records albums
Michael Feinstein albums
2001 albums
Collaborative albums